Frederick, Freddie or Fred Hart may refer to:
 Frederick Hart (politician) (1836–1915), member of the Queensland Legislative Council
 Fred J. Hart (businessman) (1888–1976), American farmer and businessman in the field of radionics
 Fred J. Hart (politician) (1908–1983), American businessman and politician in Illinois
 Fred Hart (engineer) (1914–2008), British automotive engineer
 Freddie Hart (1926–2018), stage name of Frederick Segrest, American country musician and songwriter
 Frederick Hart (sculptor) (1943–1999), American sculptor

See also
 Frederick Hartt (1914–1991), professor of history of art